is a Japanese anime television series adapted from the manga of the same name by Kazuya Minekura. Produced by Studio Pierrot, the series is directed by Tetsuya Endo, written by Tetsuya Endo and composed by Daisuke Ikeda.

The series is the sequel of Gensomaden Saiyuki, premiered on TV Tokyo from October 2, 2003 to March 25, 2004. Saiyuki Reload was licensed by Geneon in North America, and consist of 25 episodes. In the Saiyuki Reload Priest Genjo Sanzo and companions Cho Hakkai, Sha Gojyo, and Son Goku maintain their westward journey to stop the resurrection of the demon Gyoumao. As the reputation of the Sanzo Ikkou precedes them, they continue to fight demon assassins at every turn, but they must also deal with increasing tensions within their group in order to defeat a powerful enemy.

Saiyuki Reload is faithful to the manga from the fourteenth episode and onward, having deviated from it for the first 13 episodes. A sequel titled Saiyuki Reload Gunlock (最遊記ＲＥＬＯＡＤＧＵＮＬＯＣＫ, Saiyūki RELOAD GUNLOCK) was also created by the companies and aired on the same network. A new OVA has been released by Studio Pierrot, which covers the "Burial" arc of the Saiyuki Reload manga; it is called Saiyuki Reload: Burial. An anime television series adaptation of the Saiyuki Reload Blast manga series aired from July 5 to September 20, 2017, on Tokyo MX, TV Aichi, BS11, Sun TV. It ran for 12 episodes. Also a new anime series produced by Liden Films titled Saiyuki Reload: Zeroin has been announced on January 10, 2021. It aired from January 6 to March 31, 2022, on AT-X and other networks.

Saiyuki Reload premiered on the Starz/Encore Action channel in North America on November 8, 2006.

On February 18, 2021, Crunchyroll added the series for streaming.

On November 30, 2021, Discotek Media licensed the anime for a Blu-ray release in standard definition as it includes the original Japanese language, English subtitles and the English dub.

Three pieces of theme music are used for the episodes—one opening themes and two ending themes. The opening themes is "Wild Rock" by BUZZLIP. The two ending themes, "ID" by flow-war and "Fukisusabu Kaze no Naka de" by WAG.



Episode list

References

External links 
Official Studio Pierrot Saiyuki Reload website 
Official Studio Pierrot Saiyuki Reload website 

Saiyuki (manga)
Saiyuki